This page shows a list of results of Moldova national football team from the team's first match until the end of 1999.

Matches

1991

1992

1994

1995

1996

1997

1998

1999

Notes
The ELO ratings include an away match against Belarus on 12 May 1993 (won 1–0), which is not included in the above table.
RSSSF include an away match against Romania B on 1 June 1993 (lost 3–2), which is not included in the above table.

References
All details are sourced to the match reports cited, unless otherwise specified:

External links
Moldova - International Results 1991 to 2008
Reports for all matches of Moldova national team at eu-football.info
All matches of Moldova national team at soccerway

Moldova national football team results
1990s in Moldovan sport